Millerigobius macrocephalus is a species of goby native to coastal waters of the Adriatic Sea, the Levant Sea, the western Mediterranean and the Aegean Sea where it occurs in lagoons and shallow inshore waters to about  in depth with stones to provide shelter.  This species can reach a length of  SL.  It is currently the only known member of its genus.

References

large-headed goby
Fish of the Adriatic Sea
Fish of the Mediterranean Sea
Fish of Europe
large-headed goby
large-headed goby